Obesity in the Republic of Ireland is a major health concern. Ireland has one of Europe's highest rates of obesity; 60% of adults, and over 20% of children and young people, in the country are overweight or obese. In 2011, 23.4% of the country's population was obese. The country's mean BMI increased by 1.1kg (2.4lbs)/m² between 1990 and 2001 and /m² between 2001 and 2011. A PubMed study found obesity among children specifically in Ireland fell from 25% in 2005 to 16% by 2019; however, the study cautions that obesity remains a serious problem in Ireland.

References

Ireland
Health in the Republic of Ireland